Formerly or currently considered subspecies or populations of brown bears have been listed as follows:

List

Eurasia and North Africa

North America

Ecotypes or regional populations
Brown bear size, most often measured in body mass, is highly variable and is correlated to extent of food access. Therefore, bears whose range in areas with access to openings, cover, and moisture or water are on average larger, whereas those bears that range into enclosed forested areas or arid, sparsely vegetated regions, both of which tend to be suboptimal foraging habitat for brown bears, average smaller. These mass variations represent only two widespread subspecies, the grizzly bear in North America and the Eurasian brown bear in Europe. Due to the lack of genetic variation within subspecies, the environmental conditions in a given area likely plays the largest part in such weight variations.

The grizzly is especially variable in size, as grizzlies from the largest populations, i.e., interior Alaska, with the heaviest weights recorded in Nelchina, Alaska, nearly three times heavier in males than the smallest grizzlies from Alberta, Canada's Jasper National Park. The enclosed taiga habitat of Jasper presumably is sub-optimal foraging habitat for grizzlies, requiring them to range widely and feed sparsely, thus reducing body weights and putting bears at risk of starvation, while in surfaces areas in the tundra and prairie are apparently ideal for feeding. Even elsewhere in Alberta, weights averaging more than twice those of Jasper grizzlies have been recorded. A gradual diminishment in body size is noted in grizzly bears from the sub-Arctic zone, from the Brooks Range to the Mackenzie Mountains, presumably because food becomes much sparser in such regions, although perhaps the most northerly recorded grizzly bears ever, in the Northwest Territories, was a large and healthy male weighing , more than twice as much as an average male weighs near the Arctic Circle. Data from Eurasia similarly indicates a diminished body mass in sub-Arctic brown bears, based on the weights of bears from northern Finland and Yakutia.

Exceptionally large inland specimens have been reported in several parts of North America, Europe, Russia and even Hokkaido. The latter bear, from Western Russia, reportedly measured just under  in head-and-body length.

In Eurasia, the size of bears roughly increases from the west to the east, with the largest bears there native to Eastern Russia. Even in the nominate subspecies, size increases in the eastern limits, with mature male bears in Arkhangelsk Oblast and Bashkortostan commonly exceeding . Other bears of intermediate size may occur in inland populations of Russia. Much like the grizzly bear and Eurasian brown bear, populations of the Ussuri brown bear (U. a. lasiotus) and the East Siberian brown bear (U. a. collaris) may vary widely in size. In some cases, the big adult males of these populations may have matched the Kodiak bear in size. East Siberian brown bears from outside the sub-Arctic and mainland Ussuri brown bears average about the same size as the largest-bodied populations of grizzly bears, i.e., those of similar latitude in Alaska, and have been credited with weights ranging from  throughout the seasons. This is due presumably to the enclosed mixed forest habitat of Hokkaido.

In linear measurements and mean body mass, several subspecies may vie for the title of smallest subtype, although thus far, their reported body masses broadly overlaps with those of the smaller-bodied populations of Eurasian brown bears and grizzly bears. Leopold (1959) described the now-extinct Mexican grizzly bear (U. a. nelsoni) that, according to Rausch (1963), as the smallest subtype of grizzly bear in North America, although the exact parameters of its body size are not known today. Himalayan brown bear females were cited with an average head-and-body length of merely . These smallest brown bear subtypes are characteristically found in "barren-ground" type habitats, i.e., sub-desert in bears of the Syrian subspecies and the Gobi subtype and arid alpine meadow in Himalayan brown bears.
	

 
The largest subspecies are the Kodiak bear (U. a. middendorffi) and the questionably-distinct peninsular giant bear or coastal brown bear (U. a. gyas). Also, the extinct California grizzly bear (U. a. californicus) was rather large. The reported mean adult body masses for both sexes of the polar bear are very similar to the peninsular giant and Kodiak bears. Due to their roughly corresponding body sizes, the two subtypes and the species can both legitimately be considered the largest living member of the bear family Ursidae and the largest extant terrestrial carnivores. Claims have been made of larger brown bears, but these appear to be poorly documented and unverified and some, even if recited by reputable authors, may be dubious hunters' claims.
 
The largest variety of brown bear from Eurasia is the Kamchatkan brown bear (U. a. beringianus). However, a diminishment in body size of U. a. berigianus has been noted, mostly likely in correlation with overhunting.

References

Brown bears
Lists of animals
Subspecies